Bélanger is a French surname, popular in Canada. Notable people with the name include:

A-F
 Alain Bélanger (born 1956), Canadian ice hockey player
 Alexis Bélanger (1808–1868), Roman Catholic priest and missionary
 Amable Bélanger (1846–1919), Canadian iron founder, industrialist and community leader
 Aurélien Bélanger (1878–1953), Ontario political figure
 Buckley Belanger (born 1960), Canadian provincial politician
 Charley Belanger (1901–1970), Canadian boxer
 Daniel Bélanger (born 1961), Canadian singer-songwriter
 Denis Bélanger (born 1964), Canadian vocalist and lyricist
 Dina Bélanger (1897–1929), Canadian religious figure and musician
 Edwin Bélanger (1910–2005), Canadian conductor, violinist, violist, arranger, and music educator
 Éric Bélanger (born 1977), Canadian ice hockey player
 Francis Bélanger (born 1978), Canadian ice hockey player
 François-Joseph Bélanger (1744–1818), French architect and decorator
 François-Xavier Bélanger (1833–1882), French-Canadian naturalist and museum curator

G-L
 Geneviève Bélanger (born 1987), Canadian synchronized swimmer
 Gérard Bélanger (born 1940), Canadian economics professor
 Grégoire Bélanger (1889–1957), Canadian politician of Quebec
 Guy Bélanger (born 1946), Canadian tenor, opera director, composer, and conductor
 Guy Bélanger (politician) (born 1942), Canadian member of the National Assembly of Quebec
 Horace Bélanger (1836–1892), Lower Canadian fur trader
 Hugo Bélanger (born 1970), Canadian ice hockey left wing
 Jean Bélanger (1782–1827), notary and political figure in Lower Canada
 Jean-Baptiste-Charles-Joseph Bélanger (1790–1874), French applied mathematician
 Jeff Belanger (born 1974), American author, public speaker and paranormal investigator
 Jesse Bélanger (born 1969), Canadian ice hockey centre
 John Belanger (born c. 1949), Canadian Paralympic athlete
 Josée Bélanger (born 1986), Canadian soccer player
 Joseph Albert Bélanger (1922–2005), Ontario dairy farmer and political figure
 Karl Bélanger (born 1975), Canadian political consultant
 Ken Belanger (born 1974), Canadian ice hockey forward
 Louis Bélanger (born 1964), Canadian film director and screenwriter
 Louis-Philippe-Antoine Bélanger (1907–1989) was a Canadian politician
 Luc Bélanger (born 1975), Canadian ice hockey goaltender

M-Y
 Madeleine Bélanger (born 1932), Canadian politician from Quebec
 Marc Bélanger (disambiguation), multiple people
 Marcel Bélanger (1920–2013), Canadian academic
 Mark Belanger (1944–1998), American baseball shortstop
 Maurice Bélanger (1912–1964), Canadian politician
 Mauril Bélanger (1955–2016), Canadian politician
 Michel Bélanger (1929–1997), Canadian businessman and banker
 Michelle Belanger, American author, singer and advocate for the vampire community
 Nancy Bélanger (born 1978), Canadian curler
 Pierre Bélanger (born 1960), Canadian lawyer and politician
 Richard Bélanger, Canadian city councillor
 Roger Belanger (1965–2011), Canadian ice hockey player
 Serge Bélanger, Canadian politician in Montreal, Quebec
 Sylvie Bélanger (born 1951), Canadian interdisciplinary artist using sound, video, photography and installation
 Tammy Belanger (born 1976), American child who disappeared in 1984
 Terry Belanger (born 1941), American librarian and professor
 William V. Belanger Jr. (1928-2018), American politician and businessman
 Yves Bélanger (disambiguation), multiple people

See also
Bellanger

French-language surnames